"La Santa" (English: "The Saint") is a song by Puerto Rican rapper Bad Bunny featuring guest vocals from Daddy Yankee from the former's third studio album YHLQMDLG (2020). The song was written by Benito Martínez, Ramon Ayala and Marco Masis with the latter handling the production as Tainy. "La Santa" contains interpolations from "Aquí Está Tu Caldo", written and performed by Daddy Yankee.

Promotion and release
On February 28, 2020, Bad Bunny announced his third studio album that was revealed to be YHLQMDLG during his performance and guest appearance on The Tonight Show Starring Jimmy Fallon, which was released the following day.

Commercial performance
Following the releasing of YHLQMDLG, "La Santa" charted at number 53 on the US Billboard Hot 100 dated March 14, 2020  as well as peaking at number 6 on the US Hot Latin Songs chart upon the same issue date. In Spain, "La Santa" reached at number 7.

Audio visualizer
A visualizer video for the song was uploaded to YouTube on February 29, 2020, along with the other visualizer videos of the songs that appeared on YHLQMDLG.

Charts

Weekly charts

Year-end charts

Certifications

References

External links
 

2020 songs
Bad Bunny songs
Songs written by Bad Bunny